Honoré Mercier Jr.  (20 March 1875 – 19 June 1937) was a member of the Legislative Assembly of Quebec. He was the son of the former Quebec Premier Honoré Mercier and father of Honoré Mercier III.

Early years
Mercier was born in Saint-Hyacinthe, Quebec, and attended Collège Sainte-Marie and Université Laval law school. He was admitted to the Quebec Bar in 1900 and became a KC in 1913.

Mercier was a lawyer prior to his political career.

Politics
He was first elected in the 1904 Quebec general election for the Quebec Liberal Party, but was defeated in 1908.  However, he was then elected in a 1908 by-election, and remained in the Legislative Assembly until 1936, when he did not run for re-election. He served in numerous Cabinet posts under Premiers Lomer Gouin and Louis-Alexandre Taschereau:

 Minister of Colonisation
 Minister of Mines and Fisheries 1914–1919
 Minister of Lands and Forestry 1919–1936

Outside politics
Besides his legal practice, Mercier was a member, director and headed of various organizations in Quebec:

 Director and Secretary-Treasurer, l'École des hautes études commerciales de Montréal 1907-1921
 President, l'Association internationale pour la conservation du gibier et du poisson
 Member of Montreal Press Club,
 Member of the Canadian Club
 Member of Cercle universitaire
 Member, Club Saint-Denis
 Member, Club de réforme
 Member, l'Union interalliée de Paris 
 Member, Ligue maritime et coloniale française

Gérald Fauteux was his nephew.

Honours
He was honoured with the Knight (chevalier) of the Legion of Honour of France.

External links
 

1875 births
1937 deaths
Quebec Liberal Party MNAs
Chevaliers of the Légion d'honneur